Topsham (also ) is a town in Devon, England, located on the east side of the River Exe, immediately north of its confluence with the River Clyst and the former's estuary, between Exeter and Exmouth. Topsham is a historic port and was designated a town by a 1300 royal charter granted by Edward I; it was formally amalgamated into the City of Exeter in 1966. The population of the town, recorded at the 2021 census, is 4,146.

The town is served by Topsham railway station, about midway on the branch line from Exeter Central to Exmouth, now called the Avocet Line; 2011 saw the 150th anniversary of the railway coming to Topsham.

The electoral ward of Topsham extends further northwest and includes the east half of Countess Wear as well as the new suburb of Newcourt. The population of the ward, recorded at the 2021 census, is 10,038.

History

The native Celtic settlement of Topsham became the port of the Roman city of Isca Dumnoniorum (Exeter) in the first century AD, and continued to serve it until the Roman occupation of southern Britain ceased about the year 400. In the 7th century, Saxon rule in East Devon saw the settlement grow into a considerable village.

St Margaret's Anglican church in Topsham dates back to the 10th century. Although reconstructed several times, it remains in its original location as granted in 937 by King Æthelstan, who gave "a parcel of land, i.e. a manse, which the vulgar called Toppesham, to the monastery Church of St Mary and St Peter in Exeter, for the cure of his soul, to have in eternal freedom so long as the Christian Church shall endure."

The manor of Topsham was granted by King Henry I to Richard de Redvers and became part of his feudal barony of Plympton. The estate, or sub-manor of Weare was part of this. The Weare manor house, built in Georgian style by Sir John Duckworth, 1st Baronet in about 1804, is now the club house of Exeter Golf and Country Club.

Topsham was granted a royal charter in August 1300, allowing the town to hold a street market and annual fayre; in recent times, a 'Charter Day' festival is held in the town on a day in August, to celebrate this.

Topsham's position, offering a sheltered harbour to seagoing trade, enabled it to thrive as a port, a centre for both fishing and shipbuilding. The town was the scene of a notable Parliamentarian naval assault during the English Civil War.

There are many Dutch-style houses in Topsham dating from the time when Topsham was an important cotton port. Many of Topsham's houses are built using Dutch bricks, which were brought over as ballast from the Netherlands – whereto the wool and cotton from South West England had been exported.

Topsham was absorbed into the City of Exeter local government district, along with the parishes of Alphington and Pinhoe, in 1966; they had previously been part of St Thomas Rural District. In 1977, the section of the M5 motorway that passes through the western edge of the town and crosses the River Exe, and which remains to this day the final section of the M5, was completed.

After a period of decline over the first half of the 20th century, Topsham has increasingly become a desirable and high-value residential location. The 21st century has seen development in the 'Topsham Gap' – greenfield land between Topsham and Exeter; the town's population has grown from 3,545 in 2001, to 3,730 in 2011, to 4,146 in 2021.

Today

Formerly a major seaport, the town is now of interest for its architecture, scenery and proximity to nature reserves for wading and migrating birds, such as RSPB Bowling Green Marsh on the Exe Estuary, the whole of which is a Site of Special Scientific Interest (SSSI).

Topsham Museum is located in one of a set of 17th century buildings looking out over the Exe Estuary. It consists of furnished period rooms, displays of the local history of the town and memorabilia of Vivien Leigh, the film star.

In 2021, the Sunday Times national newspaper named Topsham "one of the best places to live".

National Cycle Route 2 passes through the town. In November 2013, a new bridge opened that forms part of a new route for cyclists and pedestrians which crosses the River Clyst and connects the town with Ebford and Exton.

Name and pronunciation

The name is an Anglo-Saxon one, and means Toppa's village, Toppa having been the local landowner.

There is some difference of opinion on the correct pronunciation of the town.

In the United States, Topsham, Maine and Topsham, Vermont were named for the English town.

Sport
Topsham's local football club is Topsham Town FC, a non-league side playing in the Devon Football League. Topsham Rugby Club has two men's senior sides, one women's senior side and over 200 juniors making it one of the largest "junior" clubs in the South West. The town also has a bowling club, an outdoor swimming pool, a cricket club (Topsham St. James CC) and a sailing club.

Community and recreation

One of the main focal points of the town is Topsham Pool. Topsham Pool is a community run project in the centre of the town. It was funded by a large fundraising exercise in the 1970s which included collecting waste paper and glass bottles, jumble sales and donations. A Sports Council grant completed the fund raising effort and, in 1979, the pool was opened by Olympic gold medallist swimmer David Wilkie. Topsham Pool is an open-air pool and, as a result, is only open between May and September. Between 6 am and 8.30 am each morning, the Pool welcomes the Nutters Club – a group that swims when the outside temperature is likely to be at its coolest.

In response to what had been described in the early 1960s as "a period of genteel decline", The Topsham Society was formed. The objectives of the Topsham Society are "To promote high standards of planning and architecture in or affecting Topsham; to educate the public in the geography, history, natural history and architecture of Topsham; to secure the preservation protection development and improvement of features of historic or public interest in Topsham". The Society currently has around 400 members.

In addition to St Margaret's Anglican church, there is also a Methodist church situated in Fore Street, a Congregational Church situated in Victoria Road, and a Roman Catholic church, dedicated to the Holy Cross, which meets in Station Road.

The Bridge Inn is a grade II listed public house at Bridge Hill, that dates to the 18th century. It is on the Campaign for Real Ale's National Inventory of Historic Pub Interiors. It was visited by Elizabeth II in 1998.

A monthly magazine is published called Estuary: A Monthly Community Magazine for Topsham, which is published by St Margaret's Anglican Church, but is more of a community publication than an ecclesiastical one. It is currently priced £0.90 per month, and copy to be received by the 15th of the preceding month. It is co-edited by Diana Trout and José Northey.

There is a community centre called the Matthews Hall located in the centre of the town, provided by the Topsham Community Association. Local groups can use this facility, and these include the Topsham Film Club and the Topsham Flower Club. Twice a year, Estuary Players present a theatrical production in the Matthews Hall. They are a notably eclectic group, but Shakespeare and Brecht have featured among their favourite playwrights over their 35-year existence. The Community Association also run a Saturday market, held at the Matthews Hall, and appoint the town crier.

Topsham Art Group had a summer exhibition in 2012 at The Topsham School featuring local artists.

2011 marked the 80th anniversary of the Topsham Town Fayre and Carnival. As of 2018 there is no longer a Carnival. Every two years the town holds a Longest Table event, which involves tables being placed end to end through the streets with people bringing food for their own table. 

The Estuary League of Friends charity supports elderly people in the local community.

Notable residents
William Webb Follett, the noted lawyer and parliamentarian, was born here in 1796. 
General George Warren (cir 1801–1884) was born here . 
Thomas Hardy's cousin, Tryphena Sparks, who was the inspiration for Hardy's poem Thoughts of Phena at News of Her Death lived here and is buried here. She was known locally for the charitable work she did for the local fishermen. Dick Pym, the footballer, was born here in 1893; he was a goalkeeper in the first Wembley FA Cup Final in 1923, and died in Exeter in 1988, aged 95. The newsreader, Trevor McDonald, is a past resident of the town, and both members of the folk group Show of Hands live in Topsham. Clifford Fishwick artist and principal of Exeter College of Art and Design lived here until his death in 1997. The actor Bill Pertwee (ARP Warden William Hodges in Dad's Army) also lived here. Novelist Philip Hensher also lives here. His 2011 book King of the Badgers is set in a fictional town based on Topsham. 
Artist Hester Frood lived at 26 The Strand after her marriage in 1927, she is buried in the cemetery.
The mountain climber Norman Croucher is a resident of Topsham.

References

External links

Topsham town page
The port of Topsham Exeter City Council page
Topsham Museum page
Topsham Community Association
Topsham and Wear Mission Community (Church of England)
Topsham Pool website
 

Areas of Exeter
Towns in Devon
Ports and harbours of Devon
Former civil parishes in Devon
Former manors in Devon